Emmanuel Kipkurui Korir (born 15 June 1995) is a Kenyan middle-distance runner. He is the 2020 Tokyo Olympic and 2022 World champion in the 800 metres. Korir won the silver medal in the event at the 2018 African Championships in Athletics.

As of November 2022 he was ranked as the sixth fastest athlete of all time over the 800 m, with a personal best of 1:42.05. Korir is a three-time Diamond League champion at the event.

Career
In 2013, athletics coach Brother Colm O’Connell, who was also based in Iten in Kenya, convinced Emmanuel Korir to switch from shorter sprints to the 400 metres.

After 1:46.94 run in the finals of the 2016 Kenyan Championships, he was offered  a scholarship at the University of Texas in El Paso, Texas in the USA. While at UTEP Miners, he was coached by the Olympic 800 m champion Paul Ereng.

In January 2017, Korir set a indoor world record for the 600 metres. The same year, he left the UTEP for a professional running contract with Nike, Inc.

In 2017 and 2019, he failed to make the 800 metres finals at the World Athletics Championships, securing the silver medal in the event at the 2018 African Championships in Athletics.

Korir qualified to represent Kenya at the 2020 Tokyo Olympics, where he won the gold medal in the 800 m event with a time of 1:45.06.

He completed the Olympic-world double at the 2022 World Athletics Championships held in Eugene, Oregon, claiming 800 m title in a season's best of 1:43.71. At the Commonwealth Games in Birmingham the following month, he was disqualified for a lane infringement in the men's 400 metres heats.

His current residence is El Paso, Texas.

Achievements

International competitions

Circuit wins and titles
 Diamond League champion 800 m (3):  2018,  2021,  2022
 800 metres wins, other events specified in parenthesis
 2017 (1): Monaco Herculis
 2018 (5): Doha Diamond League, Eugene Prefontaine Classic, London Anniversary Games (WL PB ), Birmingham British Grand Prix (MR), Brussels Memorial Van Damme
 2021 (1): Zürich Weltklasse
 2022 (2): Chorzów Kamila Skolimowska Memorial, Zürich (WL)

National and NCAA championships
 Kenyan Athletics Championships
 400 metres: 2018
 NCAA Division I Men's Outdoor Track and Field Championships
 800 metres: 2017
 NCAA Division I Men's Indoor Track and Field Championships
 800 metres: 2017

Personal bests
 400 metres – 44.21 (Nairobi 2018)
 800 metres – 1:42.05 (London 2018)
 800 metres indoor – 1:44.21 (New York, NY 2018)
 1000 metres – 2:18.19 (Monaco 2022)

References

External links

 

Living people
1995 births
Kenyan male middle-distance runners
UTEP Miners men's track and field athletes
World record setters in athletics (track and field)
IAAF Continental Cup winners
Diamond League winners
Athletes (track and field) at the 2020 Summer Olympics
Medalists at the 2020 Summer Olympics
Olympic gold medalists for Kenya
Olympic gold medalists in athletics (track and field)
Olympic athletes of Kenya
People from Uasin Gishu County